Progress is the sixth studio album by British band Take That. It is the band's final album to feature the classic five-piece, with the return of Robbie Williams since his initial departure from the band in 1995, joined only on this album, and the final album to feature Jason Orange due to his departure from the band in 2014. The album was released in the United Kingdom on 15 November 2010.

The album received positive reviews, with most critics commending the influence of electronic music and synthesizers on the album. The album debuted at number one on the UK Albums Chart, becoming the third fastest-selling album of the century and the fifth fastest-selling album of all-time in the United Kingdom. Progress also became the biggest-selling album of 2010 by selling over one million copies in 24 days. As of June 2011, the album had sold 2.8 million copies in the UK. The album also became a commercial success in Continental Europe, where it charted within the top ten of twelve countries. The album has been certified three-times platinum by the International Federation of the Phonographic Industry for shipments of three million copies inside Europe. On 10 June 2011, the album was released alongside the EP Progressed, which features eight previously unreleased tracks.

Background 
In July 1995, Robbie Williams announced that he was leaving Take That. Following his departure, the group disbanded until 2005 when they made their reunion without Williams. In 2008, during the band's work on their fifth studio album, The Circus, Williams held a meeting with Gary Barlow and the other band members at his former house in Los Angeles after re-establishing contact in May 2006 during the Ultimate Tour. In 2010, in an interview on BBC Radio 1, Williams elaborated, "'It is one of those situations in life that could be very explosive and could go completely wrong. We had that big chat and the most amazing thing happened at the end of it. We both said sorry to each other and we both meant it and that was all we needed." Barlow added "I spent the last 15 years thinking about what I was going to say."

On 15 July 2010, it was announced that Williams would be returning to the band. A joint statement between Williams and the group said, "The rumours are true ... Robbie is back ... and to celebrate, we've written and recorded a new album, due for release later this year." On the same date, national newspapers printed the headline: "Following months of speculation, it has been confirmed that Robbie Williams is to make a return to Take That. Gary, Howard, Jason, Mark and Robbie have been recording a new studio album as a five-piece, which is due for release in November."

Work on the album commenced in September 2009, following the final date of their sell-out Take That Present: The Circus Live tour. Shortly afterwards, it was confirmed that, all five members of the band had met up, to begin writing the six songs which would set the foundation for the album. The album marks the band's 20th year in the music industry, as well as fifteen years since the release of the Nobody Else album, the last material the band recorded as a five-piece. The album cover was photographed by Nadav Kander, who had previously photographed Barack Obama. It mimics the iconic ape-to-man image, and has been positively received by critics.

Release
The album was originally due for release on 22 November 2010; however, the release date was later brought forward a week to 15 November 2010. Barlow claimed that the decision was made after "massive pre-orders for the album" and after "analysing airplay and order data", with him revealing that "We've also never seen one of our singles played so much."

Singles
 "The Flood" was released as the album's lead single on 7 November 2010.
 "Kidz" was released as the album's second single on 20 February 2011.
 "Happy Now" was released as the third single from the album on 18 March 2011.
 "Love Love" was released as the album's fourth single and the first single from the double disc edition, titled Progressed on 11 May 2011.
 "When We Were Young" was released as the album's fifth single and the second single from Progressed on 11 July 2011.

Critical reception

Progress received positive reviews from music critics. At Metacritic, which assigns a normalized rating out of 100 to reviews from mainstream critics, the album received an average score of 80, based on 8 reviews, which indicates "generally favourable reviews".

Q praised the album calling it "a triumph; musically, conceptually, personally." Virgin Media gave the album 7 out of 10, calling it "a deceptively dark offering from the usually quite cheerful man band". The Guardian gave Progress a rating of four out of five commenting that "Take That's first album as a quintet since 1995 is informed by two things: a genuinely new sound and Robbie Williams's seamless reimmersion into life as a band member, which is played out on emotional duets with Gary Barlow and Mark Owen" and concluding that "[Williams] and his bandmates have produced a noteworthy modern album." BBC Music gave the album a positive review stating: "If the title of Progress suggests the band's new sound will be a merging and evolving of Take That Mk.II and recent Robbie Williams fare, the reality is startlingly different. Progress is something entirely new – Take That Mk.III – and the strangest, most ambitious and most exciting record its creators have ever been involved in." Yahoo! Music UK awarded the album 8/10 and wrote, "It's all about Robbie Williams. His vocals dominant seven out of ten tracks, the keyboard heavy makeover has little to do with Take That and everything to do with his last three solo albums, and while the reunion has clearly done him the world of good, it doesn't seem like a fair and equal exchange."

Luke Turner of the NME gave the album seven stars out of ten stating the album is a "triumphant and quite crudely banging stadium synth-pop record" and praised Take That for "setting the pace [for other bands]." In his review for The Independent, Andy Gill wrote: "Rather than pop balladry, the album leans heavily on electronic beats and textures, and reflects misgivings about science and humanity", rating the album four out of five. AllMusic awarded the album four stars out of five stating "the emphasis is not on harmonies, it's on groove and texture, ballads taking a backseat to clever rips on Gorillaz or synthesized glam stomps" and concluded "Progress is the hippest and best music Take That has ever made." The Daily Express gave the album a positive review stating, "Progress is a testament to the fact they know what they're doing. This is classic pop that dips into R'n'B and rock, and it's a job well done." Neil McCormick of The Daily Telegraph gave the album three stars out of five and said that Robbie Williams "seems to have infused his band mates with his very peculiar sense of fun. ... But, be warned, it is not the Williams of Angels and Let Me Entertain You, it's the maverick maniac of the derided Rudebox" and stated "They should be applauded for daring to deliver a laugh out loud, big, brash, electro stadium epic". Entertainment.ies Jenny Mulligan described Progress as "jammed with smart, stylish and irresistibly catchy tunes" concluding that "[the album] is a belter."

Commercial performance
Prior to the release of the album it had become the most pre-ordered album of the year. On the first day of the release the album sold over 235,000 copies across the UK, making it the fastest-selling record of the century at that time (the record was later surpassed by Adele's 25, which sold over 300,000 copies on its first day of release). On 21 November 2010, Progress debuted at number one on the UK Albums Chart, becoming the band's sixth number-one album. By the end of its first week on sale the album sold around 520,000 copies, which made it the second fastest-selling album of all-time in UK chart history. In its second week, the album sold another 208,000 copies retaining the number one spot, and in its third week it sold over 174,000 copies remaining at number one. The following week Take That sold over 200,000 copies of Progress retaining the number one spot for a fourth week. On 8 December 2010, the album reached 1.009 million copies, taking 23 days to reach the figure only four more than the 19 days it took The Circus to reach one million in 2008. Progress became the first album in 2010 to break through one million sales in the UK. On its fifth week, the album sold over 330,000 copies to stay at the top of the UK Albums Chart and become Take That's third Christmas number one album, having sold more than 1.4 million copies in under five weeks. The album retained the number 1 spot for a sixth consecutive week selling over 433,000 copies, bringing total sales to 1.87 million copies and becoming the first UK number 1 album of 2011.

The album dropped to number two after a six-week run at number one. In April 2011, the album finally reached the 2 million sells mark making the album having taken 139 days to do so. It is the fourth album by the band to sell upwards of 2 million of copies, following Beautiful World, The Circus and Never Forget – The Ultimate Collection. This makes the band the only one to have four million-selling albums in the 21st century. As of June 2011, Progress had sold 2.8 million copies in the UK. The album also debuted at number one in the Irish Albums Chart on 19 November 2010, making it the band's sixth number-one album in Ireland. and at number one in Scotland. Across Europe the album achieved success with it going to number one in Greece, Germany, Denmark (going platinum by selling 30,000 copies in its first week.) and the European Top 100 Albums chart. It also debuted inside the top 10 of the charts in Austria, Italy, the Netherlands, Sweden, and Switzerland.

Track listing

Personnel 
Credits adapted from the liner notes.

Take That 
 Gary Barlow – vocals, keyboards, programming (1-4, 6-11)
 Howard Donald – vocals, drums (1, 4)
 Jason Orange – vocals
 Mark Owen – vocals
 Robbie Williams – vocals

Musicians 
 Stuart Price – keyboards (1, 2, 4-9), programming (1-4, 6-11), guitars (1, 7–10, 12, 18, 19), bass (2, 7–9, 12–14, 16, 18)
 Ryan Carline – programming (4)
 Ben Mark – guitars (1, 2, 8, 12, 14, 16, 18)
 Stephen Lipson – mandolin (12)
 Karl Brazil – drums (2, 8, 12, 14, 15)
 Wil Malone – string arrangements and conductor (1, 3, 5, 12, 15, 17, 19)
 Everton Nelson – orchestra leader (1, 3, 5, 17)
 Perry Montague-Mason – orchestra contractor and supervisor (1, 3, 5, 12, 15, 17, 19), orchestra leader (12, 15, 19)
 London Studio Orchestra – strings (1, 3, 5, 12, 15, 17, 19)

Production 
 Stuart Price – producer, mixing (1, 2, 4-11)
 Ryan Carline – engineer
 Noah Goldstein, Mike Houge, Andrew Kitchen and Ghian Wright – assistant engineers
 Richard Lancaster – string engineer (1, 3, 5, 12, 15, 17, 19)
 Dave Emery – mix assistant (1, 2, 4–11, 17), additional engineer (9, 11)
 Spike Stent – mixing (3)
 Matty Green – mix assistant (3)
 Tim Young – mastering at Metropolis Mastering (London, UK)
 Studio Fury – art direction, design 
 Nadav Kander – photography 
 Jonathan Wild and 10 Management – management 
ie Music Ltd. – management for Robbie Williams

Charts

Weekly charts

Year-end charts

Decade-end charts

Certifications

Release history

References

Take That albums
2010 albums